This is the complete list of Commonwealth Games medallists in weightlifting from 1950 to 2014.

Men's

Flyweight

Bantamweight

Featherweight

Lightweight

Middleweight

Light heavyweight

Middle heavyweight

Heavyweight

Sub heavyweight

Super heavyweight

Women's

48kg

53kg

58kg

63kg

69kg

75kg

75+kg

90kg

+90kg

Powerlifting

Men's 72 kg

Men's +72  kg

Women's 61 kg

Women's +61 kg

Men's open

Women's open

Bench Press EAD

References
Results Database from the Commonwealth Games Federation

Weightlifting
Medalists
Commonwealth

Commonw